Israel Charles White (November 1, 1848 – November 24, 1927) was an eminent geologist and professor, internationally known, and the first state geologist of West Virginia.

White was born on a farm in the Battelle district of Monongalia County, West Virginia, United States, of western Monongalia County and grew up in Morgantown. White graduated from West Virginia University in June 1872 with a bachelor's degree in geology and did postgraduate studies in Geology and Chemistry from Columbia School of Mines and received a doctoral degree from the University of Arkansas in 1880. He began his career in 1875 as an assistant geologist in Pennsylvania. In 1877 he assumed the chair of Geology at West Virginia University, where he taught until 1892.

In 1878, he was elected as a member of the American Philosophical Society.

From 1884 to 1888, he worked as an assistant geologist for the United States Geological Survey, focusing on coal in Pennsylvania, Ohio, and West Virginia.  He worked as a geologist at the West Virginia Geological and Economic Survey from 1897 onwards, eventually becoming chief of staff.

White field tested the "Anticlinal Theory"  for oil and gas exploration in 1883.  White then went on to discover the Pennsylvania and Washington gas and oil field, the Grapeville gas field, the Belle Vernon field, and then in 1889, the Mannington oil field.  As White stated, "It taught the practical oil men once and for all that they could not afford to disregard geological truths in their search for oil deposits.

In 1904 he was hired by the Brazilian government as head of the "Comissão de Estudos das Minas de Carvão de Pedra do Brasil" (Commission for Studies on Brazilian Coal Mines), whose aim was to identify the potential of Brazilian coal, and whose report, published in 1908, was a milestone for understanding the geology of the Paraná Basin in Southern Brazil. One of the main results of these studies, besides the reconnaissance for coal, was the discovery of Mesosaurus fossils within Permian black shales (Irati Formation), and the Glossopteris flora within the Permian coals. White was one of the first to propose the  equivalence between the South American Permian strata and similar rocks of the Karoo Basin in South Africa. This report had an important contribution to the development of Continental Drift Theory, published by Alfred Wegener in 1912.

He was the treasurer of the Geological Society of America in 1892–1907 and its president in 1920. He died in Baltimore, Maryland, aged 79.

References

External links
The West Virginia & Regional History Center at West Virginia University houses the papers of Israel C. White in three collections, A&M 469, A&M 710, and A&M 797
The White stratigraphic column, Classic Geologic Section of the Gondwana Continent in Brazil

Additional reading
 "Israel Charles White" West Virginia Division of Culture and History, obituary from the Morgantown Post 25 November 1927
 "History of WV Mineral Industries - Oil and Gas" West Virginia Geological and Economic Survey, Department of Commerce, West Virginia
 "About Geology and Geography at West Virginia University" West Virginia University
 Allison, Lee (30 June 2008) "Arizona Geology: 100 years of AASG", State Geologist, Arizona Geological Survey

1848 births
1927 deaths
American geologists
Educators from West Virginia
West Virginia University alumni
University of Arkansas alumni
West Virginia University faculty
People from Monongalia County, West Virginia
Columbia School of Mines alumni
People from Morgantown, West Virginia
Presidents of the Geological Society of America